The Apalachicola waterdog (Necturus moleri) is a species of aquatic salamander in the family Proteidae. It is endemic to the south-eastern United States.

Taxonomy 
It was formerly thought to be a lineage of the Gulf Coast waterdog (N. beyeri), but a 2020 analysis found sufficient morphological and genetic divergence for it to be considered its own species, and it was thus described as its own species, N. moleri  (alongside the Escambia waterdog, N. mounti). The specific epithet honors American herpetologist Paul E. Moler.

Distribution 
It is found in southeastern Alabama, the Panhandle of Florida, and southwestern to north-central Georgia. It is found in the Apalachicola, Chipola, Choctawhatchee/Pea, Econfina, and Ochlockonee river basins.

Description 
In contrast to N. beyeri, it is small in size, weakly spotted, and has an unstriped larva that lacks the numerous white spots of N. beyeri. It shares these phenotypic traits with N. mounti, although it is genetically distinct.

References 

Proteidae
Amphibians of the United States
Endemic fauna of the United States
Amphibians described in 2020